Sheerah is a woman in the Hebrew Bible appearing only in 1 Chronicles 7:24, where it says that she built three cities: Lower and Upper Beth-horon, and Uzzen-sheerah. She is the daughter of Ephraim, and her brothers are Shuthelah, Bered, Tahath, Eleadah, Zabad, Beriah, Rephah, Resheph, Telah, Tahan, Ladan, Ammihud, Elishama, Nun, and Joshua.  

Herbert Lockyer suggests that she "must have been a woman of physical power," while Antje Labahn and Ehud Ben Zvi note that "her prestige remained in the community" since one of the cities (Uzzen-sheerah) carried her name.

References

Books of Chronicles people
Women in the Hebrew Bible
Mythological city founders